The A4135 road is a road in Gloucestershire, England, connecting the town of Tetbury with the M5 motorway and the A38 road to the west, passing through Beverston, Dursley and Cam en route to Slimbridge.

2001 Dursley speed camera
The image (right) depicts a typical stretch of the A4135 road; the dry-stone wall illustrated is of considerable age.

See also

Slimbridge Wildfowl Trust

References

External links
Recent Schedule of Works for Gloucestershire Roads

Roads in England
Transport in Gloucestershire